Emilie Demers Boutin (September 23, 1990 — January 24, 2011) was a Canadian pair skater. She competed with Stuart Chutter. Boutin was born in Cowansville, Quebec, Canada.

Early in her pairs career, Boutin competed with Alexandre Beaulieu. She teamed up with Pierre-Philippe Joncas in July 2004. They competed on both the Senior and Junior Grand Prix in the 2006/2007 season, qualifying for the Junior Grand Prix Final and placing 8th at the Cup of China.

References

External links
 

1990 births
2011 deaths
Canadian female pair skaters
French Quebecers
People from Cowansville
Sportspeople from Quebec